Forever Plaid is an Off-Broadway musical revue written by Stuart Ross, and first performed  in New York in 1989  and now performed internationally.

Overview
The show is a revue of the close-harmony "guy groups" (e.g. The Four Aces, The Four Freshmen) that reached the height of their popularity during the 1950s. Personifying the clean-cut genre are the Plaids. This quartet of high-school chums' dreams of recording an album ended in death in a collision with a bus filled with Catholic schoolgirls on their way to see the Beatles' American debut on The Ed Sullivan Show.  The revue begins with the Plaids returning from the afterlife for one final chance at musical glory.

The songs they sing during the course of the musical include:
"Three Coins in the Fountain";
"Undecided";
"Gotta Be This or That";
"Moments to Remember";
"Crazy 'Bout Ya, Baby";
"No, Not Much";
"Sixteen Tons";
"Chain Gang";
"Perfidia";
"Cry";
"Heart and Soul";
"Lady of Spain";
"Scotland the Brave";
"Shangri-La";
"Rags to Riches"; and
"Love is a Many-Splendored Thing".

Productions
Stuart Ross explained the production history of the revue, stating that it was initially produced at the West Bank Cafe in 1987. It then ran at the Eugene O'Neill Theater Center in Waterford, Connecticut and Downstairs Cabaret in Rochester, New York, where the revue was rewritten to have the members of the Plaids killed. The revue next ran at The American Stage Company at the Becton Theatre, Teaneck, New Jersey in December 1988. The revue opened in New York in November 1989 at Steve McGraw's. The revue re-opened at McGraw's in May 1990 and closed on June 12, 1994.

The original 1989 New York cast was Stan Chandler, Guy Stroman, Gabriel Barre and Jason Graae. The original 1990 New York cast included Jason Graae (Sparky); Stan Chandler (Jinx); David Engel (Smudge); and Guy Stroman (Frankie).

Musical arrangements, vocal arrangements and musical direction were by James Raitt; the show was written, directed, and choreographed by Stuart Ross.

Musical numbers

Act I
 Deus Ex Plaid - Plaids
 Three Coins in the Fountain - Frankie, Plaids
 Gotta Be This or That / Undecided - Plaids
 Moments to Remember - Plaids
 Crazy 'Bout Ya Baby - Frankie, Plaids
 No, Not Much - Jinx, Plaids
 Perfidia - Sparky, Plaids
 Cry - Jinx, Plaids
 Sixteen Tons / Chain Gang - Smudge, Frankie, Plaids
 Private Functions: The Bride Cuts the Cake / Italian Wedding / Anniversary Waltz / Itty Bitty Town of Bethlehem / Hava Nagila / Rock-a My Soul / She Loves You - Plaids
The Golden Cardigan / Catch a Falling Star - Sparky, Plaids

Act 2
 Caribbean Plaid: Day-O / Kingston Market / Jamaica Farewell / Matilda Matilda - Jinx, Frankie, Plaids
 Heart and Soul - Frankie, Plaids
 Mercury / Lady of Spain - Jinx, Plaids
 Scotland the Brave - Plaids
 Shangri-La / Rags to Riches (samples "The Good, The Bad, and the Ugly") - Smudge, Plaids
 Love is a Many Splendored Thing - Plaids

Motion picture 

The play was produced as a motion picture (released on July 9, 2009) starring Chandler and Engel from the original cast, with Larry Raben and Daniel Reichard taking over for Sparky and Francis (Frankie), respectively.  David Hyde Pierce guest stars as the narrator. David Snyder served as musical director and pianist.  The movie was written and directed by the show's original creator, Stuart Ross, and edited by Oscar and Emmy winner Alan Helm. The performances of "The Golden Cardigan" and "Catch a Falling Star" are notably absent.

Sequels 
The Pasadena Playhouse and Neptune Theatre (Halifax), famous for its versions of the original, ran a sequel called Plaid Tidings, a holiday version with modified story and songs.  The Pasadena engagement premiered in November 2001,
and ran again in December 2002. The Los Angeles Times reviewer wrote that the musical is "enormously entertaining feel-good fare...Plaid Tidings, however, significantly expands upon the original model, its self-contained ethos of sunny homage augmented with flashes of pathos and larger point." Plaid Tidings made its New York City debut at the York Theatre Company at St. Peter's in December 2015.

It is available for licensing through Music Theatre International.

A version for high schools, The Sound of Plaid: Forever Plaid School Version, is being created by Music Theatre International.

References

External links 

Forever Plaid at the Music Theatre International website
Forever Plaid: Plaid Tidings at the Music Theatre International website
The Sound of Plaid: The New Glee Club Version of Forever Plaid at the Music Theatre International website
Official movie website

1990 musicals
Off-Broadway musicals
One-act musicals
Jukebox musicals